MINIM is a Spanish industrial rock band founded in 2006 in Vigo, Galicia.

History
The band was born in late 2006 in Vigo, when they recorded their first EP with four tracks 22:22 and 2 remixes.

After playing in 2007 all over Spain, MINIM decided to take a little break.

In mid-2008, the band reappeared with some lineup changes. Continue in lead vocals, Fran Pajares and on synths, vocals and guitars, Tino Álvarez. To they are joined on guitar, Aitor Míguez, on bass guitar, Robert Escrich and drummer Nacho González. They continued giving concerts, offering them a great show of lights and images, which no doubt characterized the band. They began to receive the first recognitions, winning several awards and competitions like XII Concuros de Pop Rock de Rivas Vaciamadrid. The press also began to take note, and they also got some minutes on the radio waves.

In March 2010, come onto the market their first album 9567: Here even it's yesterday. This album was released with Mutant-e Records under license from Creative Commons, and it published on their website to be downloaded freely. This will mark a turning point in the history of the band because from their server the album achieved 1350 downloads in three months, and the name of MINIM starts ringing throughout Europe, Russia, Japan and the United States.

Discography

Collections in which they appear:

References
 La voz de Galicia. “ Los exponentes del rock i ndustrial vigués se van a hacer «las Europas»”
 Genética Rock. “MINIM y los tiempos modernos”
 Metalicia. Banda de la semana nº3 Banda de la semana. nº 03: MINIM - metalicia
 Radio Umbria. Interview Jorge Umbrio
 Rock Estatal. Interview "MINIM Adrenalina de Fusión"

Album reviews
 Desde el altavoz Desde el altavoz: Minim - 9567: Here Even It's Yesterday (2010)
 Metal Total Minim - 9567: Here Even It's Yesterday - MetalTotal.com
 Noise Zone Minim - "9567: Here Even It..s Yesterday" - Noise Zone
 Rock in Spain MINIM "9567: Here Even It´s Yesterday" - 2010 Mutant-e

External links
 Official website
 Official MySpace
 Official Youtube Channel

Industrial rock musical groups
Industrial metal musical groups
Spanish musical groups
Galician musical groups
Musical groups established in 2006
2006 establishments in Spain
People from Vigo